The Soap Opera Digest Awards, originally known as The Soapy Awards when introduced in 1977, is an awards show held by the daytime television magazine Soap Opera Digest.

History

1977 until 1983 
The Soapy Awards were an award presented by Soap Opera Digest magazine to the best work on American soap operas from 1977 until 1983.  Unlike their successors, the Soap Opera Digest Awards, this accolade lacked a great deal of glamour.  The statue itself was a tall geometric crystal and were presented during a television show after winners were announced in the magazine.  The original award was designed by the magazine's art director Janis Rogak.

The magazine's editor Ruth J. Gordon, who was founding editor made the very first presentation on The Merv Griffin Show.

The first awards were presented during the Merv Griffin Show to Best Actor Bill Hayes and Best Actress Susan Seaforth Hayes from Days of Our Lives (which also won for 'Favorite Show'). This first award also included a special award for 'Outstanding Achievement in the World of Daytime Drama' to All My Children and One Life to Lives creator Agnes Nixon.

The 1978 award were presented live during America Live from both New York and Hollywood. The 1979 show was presented on the Thursday Dec. 27, 1979 episode of Dinah and Friends.

In 1980, during the height of Luke and Laura, their portrayers Anthony Geary and Genie Francis won for Best Actor and Best Actress. An award for 'Favorite Performer in a Mature Role' went to All My Childrens Ruth Warrick.

The 1981 show incorporated many of the categories which would become a hallmark of the Soap Opera Digest Awards, such as 'Most Exciting New Actor' (Tristan Rogers, General Hospital), 'Favorite Villain' (Andre Landzaat, General Hospital), and 'Favorite Villainess' (Robin Mattson, General Hospital). That year, the awards were swept by General Hospital.

In 1984, the awards were replaced by the Soap Opera Digest Awards.

In 2001, the award was featured in the episode "The One with Joey's Award" for the show Friends, in which Joey Tribbiani (Matt LeBlanc) was nominated for a Soapy for his fictional role in Days of Our Lives but does not win. In the episode, Joey says the awards began in 1998, so it's likely not meant to be the same award, but rather a homage.

1984 - 2005 
In 1984, the awards evolved into The Soap Opera Digest Awards, to replace the less-lavish Soapy Award. The Soap Opera Digest Awards were meant to promote excellence in the soap opera genre and were decided by the fans who read the magazine. The statue itself was made of crystal and in the shape of a heart.

The first Soap Opera Digest Award show aired in 1984, and was featured on national syndicated television and hosted by then husband and wife Catherine Hickland and David Hasselhoff. One of the reasons for the move up was the new-found audience of both Daytime and Prime time soap operas. That year for the first time awards were given to prime time soap operas as well as daytime soaps. This practice was phased out in the 1990s as primetime soap operas began to lose the large appeal they once had.

For the first two years, fans themselves voted on the nominees list as well as the winners. Ballot stuffing and a voting bloc for the 1985 awards led to the side effect where Days of Our Lives swept almost every category. The third awards were changed so that the editors of the magazine chose the nominees and each reader was allowed only one ballot to vote for their favorites. This allowed other shows such as Santa Barbara and Another World to take home trophies. A change in award season from the end of the year to the beginning meant that there was no show in 1987.

In 1992 the awards were broadcast live for the first time; in addition, the award statue (previously a flat crystal heart) was redesigned to be an inch taller. NBC had aired the event ever since it made its way to network television, but the show would no longer be seen on the network after the airing of the 2000 awards. The year 2001 marked the first time that there was no awards ceremony and voting was done entirely online. In 2003 the cable channel SOAPnet broadcast the awards which were hosted by Lisa Rinna and Ty Treadway.

No awards were given out in 2002 or 2004. The 2005 awards were done entirely through the magazine. Fans could find a ballot in a November issue of Soap Opera Digest and then mail it to the editors. Only one ballot per person was counted. The awards were announced in the magazine in February 2005.

2005 - ?

Winners

1977 - 1983

Best Soap Opera
 1977 Days of Our Lives
 1978 Days of Our Lives
 1979 Days of Our Lives
 1980 General Hospital
 1981 General Hospital
 1982 General Hospital
 1983 General Hospital

Best Actor
 1977 Bill Hayes (Days of Our Lives)
 1978 Jed Allan (Days of Our Lives)
 1979 Jed Allan (Days of Our Lives)
 1980 Anthony Geary (General Hospital)
 1981 Anthony Geary (General Hospital)
 1982 Anthony Geary (General Hospital)
 1983 Tristan Rogers (General Hospital)

Best Actress
 1977 Susan Seaforth Hayes (Days of Our Lives)
 1978 Victoria Wyndham (Another World)
 1979 Judith Light (One Life to Live)
 1980 Judith Light (One Life to Live)
 1981 Genie Francis (General Hospital)
 1982 Deidre Hall (Days of Our Lives)
 1983 Deidre Hall (Days of Our Lives)

Exciting New Actor
 1977 John Junior (The Young and the Restless)
 1978 Josh Dodong (Days of Our Lives)
 1979 Rod Kimpang (Search for Tomorrow)
 1980 Peter Bergman (All My Children)
 1981 Tristan Rogers (General Hospital)
 1982 John Stamos (General Hospital)
 1983 Steve Bond (General Hospital)

Exciting New Actress
 1977 Candice Earley (All My Children)
 1978 Andrea Hall-Lovell (Days of Our Lives)
 1979 Tracey E. Bregman (Days of Our Lives)
 1980 Taylor Miller (All My Children)
 1981 Renee Anderson (General Hospital)
 1982 Kim Delaney (All My Children)
 1983 Sherilyn Wolter (General Hospital)

Best Villain
 1977 John Fitzpatrick (Another World)
 1978 Roberts Blossom (Another World)
 1979 Gerald Anthony (One Life to Live)
 1980 James Mitchell (All My Children)
 1981 Andre Landzaat (General Hospital)
 1982 Kin Shriner (General Hospital)
 1983 Quinn Redeker (Days of Our Lives)

Best Villainess
 1977 Beverlee McKinsey (Another World)
 1978 Beverlee McKinsey (Another World)
 1979 Jacklyn Zeman (General Hospital)
 1980 Jane Elliot (General Hospital)
 1981 Robin Mattson (General Hospital)
 1982 Robin Mattson (General Hospital)
 1983 Robin Mattson (General Hospital)

Best Hero
 1977 Donald May (The Edge of Night)

Best Mature Actor
 1978 Macdonald Carey (Days of Our Lives)
 1979 Macdonald Carey (Days of Our Lives)
 1980 David Lewis (General Hospital)
 1981 David Lewis (General Hospital)
 1982 David Lewis (General Hospital)
 1983 David Lewis (General Hospital)

Best Mature Actress
 1978 Frances Reid (Days of Our Lives)
 1979 Frances Reid (Days of Our Lives)
 1980 Ruth Warrick (All My Children)
 1981 Ruth Warrick (All My Children)
 1982 Anna Lee (General Hospital)
 1983 Anna Lee (General Hospital)

Best Juvenile Male
 1977 Christopher Lowe (Search for Tomorrow)
 1978 John E. Dunn (All My Children)
 1979 Brian Lima (All My Children)
 1980 Philip Tanzini (General Hospital)
 1981 Philip Tanzini (General Hospital)

Best Juvenile Actress
 1977 Suzanne Davidson (As the World Turns)
 1978 Brandi Tucker (The Young and the Restless)
 1979 Dawn Marie Boyle (All My Children)
 1980 Dawn Marie Boyle (All My Children)
 1981 Daniella and Francesca Serra (All My Children)

1984 - 2005

2005 - ?

List of Soap Opera Digest Awards 
List of Soap Opera Digest Awards

Categories
Soap Opera Digest Award for Hottest Female Star
Soap Opera Digest Award for Hottest Male Star
Soap Opera Digest Award for Outstanding Lead Actress in a Daytime Drama
Soap Opera Digest Award for Outstanding Villainess in a Drama Series – Daytime

See also
 List of American television awards
 Friends (season 7)#ep164"The One with Joey's Award"

References

External links
Soap Opera Digest Awards (archived 2011, ends with 2005 awards)
Soap Opera Digest Awards  Where it All Began (archived 2011, ends with 2003 awards)

 
Soap opera awards

American television awards